"You & I (Nobody in the World)" is a song by American singer John Legend. Legend co-wrote the song with James Ryan Ho, Dave Tozer and Dan Wilson, with production by Malay, Tozer and Legend. It impacted urban adult contemporary radio in the United States on April 29, 2014, as the fourth single from his fourth studio album Love in the Future (2013).

Music video 
The music video for "You & I (Nobody in the World)" was released on July 10, 2014. In the video, Legend "showcases his appreciation for the true beauty of all women" and sings about his love for his wife Chrissy Teigen. The video includes appearances by actress Laverne Cox, Tig Notaro and Tatyana Ali.

Track listing 
Digital download — remix
"You & I (Nobody in the World)" (R3hab Remix) (Radio Edit) – 3:14

Charts

Weekly charts

Year-end charts

Release history

Certifications

References 

2013 songs
2014 singles
John Legend songs
GOOD Music singles
Columbia Records singles
Contemporary R&B ballads
Songs written by John Legend
Songs written by Dan Wilson (musician)
Songs written by Malay (record producer)
Songs written by Dave Tozer